The Alpine A523 is a Formula One racing car designed and constructed by the BWT Alpine F1 Team for the 2023 Formula One World Championship. The car is driven by Pierre Gasly, in his first season for the Enstone-based team, and Esteban Ocon.

Design and development
The A523 was first revealed on 16 February 2023 alongside a special pink livery for the first three races of the season. In advance of the launch, Alpine ran the car through 17 laps shared between Gasly and Ocon at the Silverstone Circuit.

Complete Formula One results
(key)

* Season still in progress.

References

External links 

A523
2023 Formula One season cars